Blue Room is Ana Popović's studio album that she made with her dad, released on May 15, 2015 on ArtisteXclusive records. The album was recorded by Ana and Milton for Ana and her children as a tribute to her father, dedicated to all the dads that support their musician and guitar playing children. Ana had played the album songs for years with Milton. Although Milton was never a professional musician, he loved the music and played as a hobby. Ana had been trying for years to get Milton into the studio, but he held back for 10 years. Ana finally convinced him to record something, and when she got him there, it was like he had always been doing studio work. The title, The Blue Room came from the name given to a room in her family's 11th floor apartment in Belgrade where Milton and his friends played and discussed blues and rock albums and a young Ana eventually picked up a guitar and joined in.

Track list

Personnel

Musicians
 Ana Popović – vocals, electric guitar, acoustic guitar, rhythm guitar, slide guitar
 Milutin Popović – vocals, electric guitar, acoustic guitar, rhythm guitar
 Rick Steff – keys (tracks 3, 4, 7, 8 & 9)
 Harold Smith – rhythm guitar (tracks 8 & 9)
 Steve Potts – drums (tracks 1 & 11)
 Dave Smith – bass
 Donald Hayes – strings (track 8)
 Deborah Winey & Susan Marshall – backing vocals (tracks 2 & 5)

Production
 Jim Gaines - production, mixing, recording, engineering
 Brad Blackwood - mastering
 Recorded on November 9–17, 2014 and January 2–3, 2015 in Stantonville, TN, and on January 4–7, 2015 at Archer Music and Arts Studio, Memphis, TN

References

Ana Popović albums
2015 albums